Conqueror is the third full-length studio album by the Indianapolis-based doom metal band The Gates of Slumber. Conqueror was listed as the #5 release of 2008 by Decibel Magazine.

Track listing
All Songs Written By The Gates Of Slumber, except where noted.

"Trapped In The Web" – 4:57
"Conqueror" – 8:15
"Ice Worm" – 5:19
"Eyes of the Liar" – 7:21
"Children of Satan" – 7:18
"To Kill and Be King" – 8:43
"The Machine" – 3:39
"The Dark Valley Suite" (The Gates Of Slumber, R. E. Howard) – 16:29

Personnel

Band members
Karl Simon: guitars, vocals, synthesizers
Jason McCash: bass guitar, synthesizers
"Iron" Bob Fouts: drums, percussion

Production
Recorded, Produced, Engineered & Mixed By Sanford Parker
Mastered By Colin Jordan

External links
Official MySpace Page
Decibel Magazine Article
Encyclopaedia Metallum Entry
Official MySpace Page - Profound Lore Records

2008 albums
Profound Lore Records albums
The Gates of Slumber albums